HMS Firebrand was a wooden paddle vessel launched in 1831. She was rebuilt in 1843, renamed HMS Black Eagle and employed as an Admiralty steam yacht. She was broken up in 1876.

Construction and rebuild
 
Built at Merchant's Yard, Limehouse as a wooden paddle vessel, Firebrand was launched on 11 July 1831. In 1832 her original Butterley side lever steam engine was removed and replaced in 1833 by a Maudsley, and Morgan's paddlewheels were fitted. She was rebuilt in 1843, gaining  in length, and receiving an oscillating engine manufactured by John Penn and Sons. Notably, Penn doubled the power output without increasing either the weight or space occupied. Firebrand was renamed Black Eagle on 5 February 1842.

In 1856, the Black Eagle and the paddle-wheel troopship Dee were used in a trial of J Wethered's apparatus for superheated steam.  This produced an economy of fuel of 18% in the Black Eagle, and 31% in the Dee.

Royal Yacht

She was based at Woolwich in south-east London and was part of the Royal Squadron alongside the Royal Yacht. The Black Eagle was eventually broken up at Portsmouth in March 1876. A model of the vessel is in the collection of the National Maritime Museum.

References

Bibliography

Ships of the Royal Navy
1831 ships
Paddle steamers of the United Kingdom